Tim D. Sørensen (born 10 February 1992) is a Danish handball player who plays for Mors-Thy Håndbold and the Danish national team.

References

1992 births
Living people
People from Skive Municipality
Danish male handball players
Expatriate handball players
Danish expatriate sportspeople in Sweden
IFK Kristianstad players
Sportspeople from the Central Denmark Region